The eighth running of Dwars door Vlaanderen's women's race was held on Wednesday 3 April 2019. The race started in Tielt and finished in Waregem, covering a distance of 118 km.

Teams
25 teams competed in the race.

Three additional non-UCI women's teams participated: Rogelli-Gyproc U-23, Jos Feron Lady Force, and Multum Accountants Ladies Team.

Results

See also
 2019 in women's road cycling

References

Women's cycle racing